The Museum of Contemporary Tibetan Art is located in the Rensenpark in Emmen, in the north-eastern part of the Netherlands, near the German border. It has permanent and temporary exhibitions of contemporary Tibetan art.

Museum
The museum's mission is to spread awareness of and educate local and international visitors about contemporary Tibetan art. The museum officially opened its doors in June, 2017. The museum hosts a collection of works featuring Tibetan and Tibet-inspired artists, but mainly composed of works created and donated by the founder of the museum, Tashi Norbu of Bhutan. Throughout the year the museum accommodates several retreats, workshops, lectures, and performances which focus heavily on educating the public on the preservation of Tibetan art and culture. The museum is run by a founding committee, with the help of more than 40 volunteers.

Rensenpark
The museum is established in the former zoo of the Rensenpark, Emmen, Drenthe, Netherlands. Emmen Municipality founded a creative industry hub in the Rensenpark, supporting not only the museum, but various art galleries and other artistic and non-artistic places.

Gallery

References

External links

 Museum website

2017 establishments in the Netherlands
Museums established in 2017
Asian art museums in the Netherlands
Contemporary art galleries in the Netherlands
Ethnographic museums in the Netherlands
Museums in Drenthe
Buildings and structures in Emmen, Netherlands
Tibetology
Tibetan art
21st-century architecture in the Netherlands